Adalberto Escobar (23 April 1949 – 26 June 2011) was a Paraguayan footballer. He played in 20 matches for the Paraguay national football team from 1969 to 1979. He was also part of Paraguay's squad for the 1979 Copa América tournament.

References

External links
 

1949 births
2011 deaths
Paraguayan footballers
Paraguay international footballers
Place of birth missing
Association football midfielders
Cerro Porteño players
Granada CF footballers
Elche CF players
Atlético Tembetary footballers
Club Libertad footballers
Paraguayan expatriate footballers
Expatriate footballers in Spain